Johnny McIntyre is the name of:

Johnny McIntyre (footballer, born 1895), Scottish professional footballer who played in England for Sheffield Wednesday
Johnny McIntyre (footballer, born 1898), Scottish professional footballer who played in England for Derby County and Chesterfield
Johnny McIntyre (footballer, born 1956), Scottish professional footballer, winger in Scotland for Clydebank and France for AS Cherbourg

See also
John McIntyre (disambiguation)